The Amazing Mr. Blunden is a 2021 fantasy television film, written and directed by Mark Gatiss and is a remake of Lionel Jeffries' 1972 film The Amazing Mr. Blunden. Both films were based on the 1969 novel The Ghosts by Antonia Barber.

It features cameo appearances by Madeline Smith and Rosalyn Landor who both appeared in the 1972 version.

Plot
Modern teenagers Lucy and Jamie become caretakers of a ruined house that's haunted.

Cast

Reception
The Telegraph 's review gave the film four out of five stars.

References

External links

Sky UK original programming
2021 television films
2021 films
British children's adventure films
British children's fantasy films
British fantasy adventure films
Films based on British novels
Films based on children's books
Films set in England
2020s English-language films
2020s British films